Sir William Whitmore, 2nd Baronet (6 April 1637 – 30 March 1699) was an English politician who sat in the House of Commons from 1661 to 1699.

Whitmore was the eldest son of Sir Thomas Whitmore, 1st Baronet of  Apley Hall, Shropshire and his wife Elizabeth Acton, daughter of Sir William Acton, 1st Baronet (1570-1651). He succeeded in 1653 to the baronetcy on the death of his father, who had been MP for Bridgnorth.

In 1660, Whitmore was elected Member of Parliament for the county of Shropshire and then for the borough of Bridgnorth from the Cavalier Parliament called in 1661, until his death in 1699.

Sir William married Mary Harvey, daughter of Elias Harvey of London. He died aged 61 without issue and the baronetcy became extinct. Apley Hall passed to his cousin William.

References

1637 births
1699 deaths
Baronets in the Baronetage of England
English MPs 1661–1679
English MPs 1679
English MPs 1680–1681
English MPs 1681
English MPs 1685–1687
English MPs 1689–1690
English MPs 1690–1695
English MPs 1695–1698
English MPs 1698–1700